XEEH-AM is a radio station on 1520 AM in San Luis Río Colorado, Sonora, Mexico, known as "La Primera".

History
XEEH received its concession on June 26, 1973. It was owned by Francisco Encinas Ángulo and authorized as a 1,000-watt daytimer. The station was operated by Radio Grupo OIR and known as Radio Éxitos until 2013, when it became the city's only independent commercial radio station.

References

1973 establishments in Mexico
Daytime-only radio stations in Mexico
Radio stations established in 1973
Radio stations in Sonora
Spanish-language radio stations